Salting a bird's tail is a legendary superstition of Europe and America, and an English language idiom. The superstition is that sprinkling salt on a bird's tail will render the bird temporarily unable to fly, enabling its capture.

The nursery rhyme Simple Simon, which dates to at least the 17th century and possibly earlier, includes the verse

The belief itself is documented to the 16th century, and may be older. Found in European countries such as Sweden, it also crossed the ocean to North America. It is generally told to children, and not commonly believed anymore by adults. In the verse in Simple Simon (above), the point is made even then only a simpleton would believe the legend.

Salting of a bird's tail has been used by analogy as an idiom for immobilization of persons since at least the 19th century, by writers such as Walter Scott, Robert Burns, Walter Lantz, John Phillips, and others. "Ye'll ne'er cast saut on his tail" (English: You'll never cast salt on his tail) is a Scottish proverb of unknown antiquity.

References

Superstitions of Europe
Superstitions of the United States
English-language idioms
Metaphors referring to birds